A Department of Juvenile Justice is a system for treating juvenile delinquency.

Department of Juvenile Justice may also refer to:

Australia
 New South Wales Department of Juvenile Justice

United States
 The Alaska Division of Juvenile Justice
 The California Division of Juvenile Justice
 The Florida Department of Juvenile Justice
 The Georgia Department of Juvenile Justice
 The Illinois Department of Juvenile Justice
 The Kentucky Department of Juvenile Justice
 The New York City Department of Juvenile Justice
 The North Carolina Department of Juvenile Justice and Delinquency Prevention
 The South Carolina Department of Juvenile Justice
 The Texas Juvenile Justice Department
 The Virginia Department of Juvenile Justice
 The Office of Juvenile Justice and Delinquency Prevention, part of the US Department of Justice

See also
 Juvenile court
 Youth detention center